Forsand is a former municipality in Rogaland county, Norway. The  municipality existed from 1871 until 2020 when it was merged into Sandnes municipality. It was located in the traditional district of Ryfylke. The administrative centre of the municipality was the village of Forsand. Other villages in the municipality included Lysebotn, Øvre Espedal, Oanes, Kolabygda, and Fløyrli.

Forsand municipality surrounded the famous Lysefjorden and it was located on the east side of the Høgsfjorden. In 1999, evidence of a population here dating back to around 7500 BC was located.

Prior to its dissolution in 2020, it was one of the largest municipalities within the county of Rogaland in terms of area, and one of the smallest in terms of population. The  municipality was the 141st largest by area out of the 422 municipalities in Norway. Forsand was the 376th most populous municipality in Norway with a population of 1,245.

General information

The municipality of Fossan was established on 1 January 1871 when the very large municipality of Høgsfjord was divided into two: Fossan (located east of the Høgsfjorden and south of the Frafjorden) and Høle (located west of the Høgsfjorden). Initially, Fossan had 2,081 residents.

During the 1960s, there were many municipal mergers across Norway due to the work of the Schei Committee. On 1 January 1965, the municipality was split, with everything located south and east of the Frafjorden being transferred to the neighboring municipality of Gjesdal. The reason for this border change was because this area had no road connection with the rest of Forsand, but it was connected by road to Gjesdal.

On 1 January 2020, Forsand municipality was dissolved. The area on the northwestern shore of the Lysefjorden around the Preikestolen became a part of the neighboring Strand Municipality and the rest of Forsand became part of Sandnes Municipality.

Name
The municipality (originally the parish) is named after the old Forsand farm, since the first Forsand Church was built there. The first element is the prefix for which means "outsticking" and the last element is sandr which means "sand" or "sandy beach". Before 1918, the name was written "Fossan".

Coat of arms
The coat of arms was granted on 11 March 1988. The arms show a white heron on a green background. They were designed by John Digernes to represent a common bird in the area.

Churches
The Church of Norway has one parish within the municipality of Forsand. It is part of the Ryfylke prosti (deanery) in the Diocese of Stavanger.

Geography
Forsand was a large municipality that is very mountainous with a long, narrow fjord running through the middle from east to west. The famous Kjeragbolten boulder and Kjeragfossen waterfall are located along the inner part of the fjord. The village of Lysebotn lies at the eastern end of the fjord. The lake Nilsebuvatnet is located high up in the mountains, north of Lysebotn on the border of Strand and Forsand municipalities. It is regulated for hydroelectric power use at the Lysebotn Hydroelectric Power Station.

Government
All municipalities in Norway, including Forsand, are responsible for primary education (through 10th grade), outpatient health services, senior citizen services, unemployment and other social services, zoning, economic development, and municipal roads. The municipality is governed by a municipal council of elected representatives, which in turn elect a mayor.  The municipality falls under the Ryfylke District Court and the Gulating Court of Appeal.

Municipal council
The municipal council of Forsand was made up of 17 representatives that were elected to four year terms. The party breakdown for the councils was as follows:

See also
List of former municipalities of Norway

References

External links

Municipal fact sheet from Statistics Norway 
Ryfylke visitors website
Live web camera from Lysefjord, Forsand

Sandnes
Strand, Norway
 
Former municipalities of Norway
1871 establishments in Norway
2020 disestablishments in Norway